The Models (credited also as Models) were a short-lived punk band formed in Harrow, Greater London, England. It consisted of Cliff Fox on vocals and guitar, Marco Pirroni on guitar, Mick Allen on bass and Terry Day (Terry Lee Miall) on drums.  Pirroni and Miall later achieved international fame as members of Adam and the Ants -  as a result, the band has received coverage in reference books such as Pete Frame's Rock Family Trees and Adam Ant biographies such as James Maw's The Official Adam Ant Story and Ant's own autobiography Stand and Deliver.

Pirroni and Allen became friends while attending art school in Harrow. When punk emerged in 1976, they first formed Siouxsie and the Banshees, playing guitar, although for only a brief time. Shortly after that, he and Allen formed a band called The Beastly Cads, who later changed their name to The Models. The band only released one single "Freeze" and recorded four songs for a Peel Session before dissolving. Later, Pirroni and Allen formed Rema-Rema, a post-punk band. 

Pirroni later re-teamed up with Day, who by then was using his real name Terry Lee Miall, in Adam and the Ants, beginning to work alongside that band's singer and frontman, Adam Ant. Allen went on to other projects, the longest running being The Wolfgang Press on the influential British record label 4AD. After the demise of the band he paired up with Giuseppe De Bellis, to form the experimental project Geniuser.

References

External links
PUNK77: The Models
MySpace: Terry Lee Miall (formerly Terry Day) (official)
Terry Lee Miall (formerly Terry Day) interview

English punk rock groups
Musical groups from London